The 2013 Guangzhou Evergrande season is the 60th year in Guangzhou Evergrande's existence and is its 46th season in the Chinese football league, also its 24th season in the top flight. The club won its third consecutive top-tier league title and became the first club in China to win the AFC Champions League.

Players

First team squad

Reserve squad

Out on loan

Technical staff

Last updated: June 2013
Source: Guangzhou Evergrande F.C.

Transfers

In

Winter

Out

Winter

Summer

Loan in

Loan out

Pre-season and friendlies

Training matches

Bahia de Cadiz Cup 2013

Competitions

Overview

Competition record

Chinese Super League

League table

Results summary

Results by round

Matches

Chinese FA Cup

Chinese FA Super Cup

AFC Champions League

Group stage

Knockout stage

Round of 16

Quarter-finals

Semi-finals

Final

FIFA Club World Cup

Statistics

Appearances and goals

Goalscorers

Clean sheets

Disciplinary record

Overview

Notes and references

Guangzhou F.C.
Guangzhou F.C. seasons